Elspeth Mary Campbell, Baroness Campbell of Pittenweem (born January 1940) is the wife of the former Liberal Democrat leader Sir Menzies Campbell.

Biography
Elspeth Urquhart was born in New Delhi, India, one of four children of Major-General Roy Urquhart and his wife Pamela. She lived in Exmouth Devon with Alice (Adgie) Sweet, carer for the children of British parents in colonial India. After the Second World War she accompanied her family to Kuala Lumpur when her father was posted to British Malaya during the Malayan Emergency. This was followed by two years in Austria before she returned to Exmouth, Devon and was sent to the convent school there. At school she earned A levels that would have enabled her admission to Oxford, but her father vetoed this idea and she was instead sent to a finishing school. She later worked at the Conservative Party's London offices.

On 13 October 1962, Urquhart married Canadian-born Sir Philip Grant-Suttie, 8th Baronet. They had one son, and were divorced in 1969. It was during this divorce that she was introduced to Menzies Campbell by her barrister, future Conservative member of parliament Sir Nicholas Fairbairn. She married Campbell in June 1970 and this marriage is childless.

Lady Campbell is known for her strong personality, and is believed to have persuaded her husband to stand in the 2006 Liberal Democrat leadership election, in which he was eventually victorious.

Lady Campbell is well known for hosting grand dinner parties. She is a fan of Coronation Street and wrote a thesis on the series for an Open University degree.

Notes

References
 Where there's smoke, there's Elspeth, The Sunday Times, 15 January 2006
 Treat her like a lady, Scottish Field, 16 August 2004

1940 births
Living people
Alumni of the Open University
Spouses of British politicians
Spouses of life peers
Campbell of Pittenweem
Wives of baronets
Wives of knights